Eochaid or Eochaidh (earlier Eochu or Eocho, sometimes Anglicised as Eochy, Achaius or Haughey) is a popular medieval Irish and Scottish Gaelic name deriving from Old Irish ech, horse, borne by a variety of historical and legendary figures.

Variations

List
Eochaid mac Eirc, mythological king of the Fir Bolg in the 16th or 20th century BC
Eochaid Ollathair, also known as The Dagda, mythical king of the Tuatha Dé Danann, said to have ruled Ireland in the 15th or 18th century BC
Eochaid Faebar Glas, legendary High King of Ireland of the 13th or 15th century BC
Eochaid Étgudach, legendary High King of Ireland of the 12th or 15th century BC
Eochaid Mumho, legendary High King of Ireland of the 12th or 15th century BC
Eochaid Apthach, legendary High King of Ireland of the 9th or 10th century BC
Eochaid Uaircheas, legendary High King of Ireland of the 8th or 9th century BC
Eochaid Fiadmuine, legendary High King of Ireland of the 8th or 9th century BC
Eochaid mac Ailella, legendary High King of Ireland of the 6th or 8th century BC
Eochaid Ailtleathan, legendary High King of Ireland of the 3rd or 5th century BC
Eochu Feidlech, legendary High King of Ireland of the 1st or 2nd century BC
Eochaid Airem, legendary High King of Ireland of the 1st or 2nd century BC
Eochaid Gonnat, legendary High King of Ireland of the 3rd century AD
Eochaid Mugmedon, semi-historical High King of Ireland of the 4th century AD
Eochaid Iarlaithe (died 666), king of the Cruthin or Dál nAraidi in Ireland
Eochaid Buide, historical king of Dál Riata in the 7th century AD
Eochaid mac Domangairt, historical king of Dál Riata in the 7th century AD
Eochaid mac Echdach, historical king of Dál Riata in the 8th century AD
Eochaid mac Áeda Find, spurious king of Dál Riata in the 8th century AD
Eochaid, son of Rhun, historical king of Strathclyde (or perhaps of the Picts) in the 9th century AD
Dallan Forgaill, Eochaid Dallan Forgall, Saint and Poet 530 - 598

Two legendary Irish High Kings were called Rothechtaid, which appears to mean "Eochaid's wheels"

Fiction
 The name Eochaid was used by Rutland Boughton for the king in his opera The Immortal Hour in 1914
 In the 2022 video game Elden Ring, "Eochaid" is a mentioned location and former home of the character "Elemer of the Briar". A collectable weapon "Regalia of Eochaid" also hails from the ficticious domain

Irish-language masculine given names